Medel is a Spanish surname. Notable people with the surname include:

Anthony Medel (born 1978), American beach volleyball player
Braulio Medel Cámara (born 1947), Spanish businessman
Elena Medel (born 1985), Spanish poet
José Medel (1938–2001), Mexican boxer
Gary Medel (born 1987), Chilean footballer
Lorenzo Medel, Filipino pianist
Marco Medel (born 1989), Chilean footballer
Pedro Medel (born 1991), Cuban swimmer

Spanish-language surnames